Will Conlon (born 29 July 1975) is a Canadian actor, best known for his role on Out With Dad.

Filmography

Cinema

Movies 
 2013 - Blood Riders: The Devil Rides with Us : Gerhard

Television

TV Movies 
 2015 - Cooked : Bill

TV Series 
 2013 - Rookie Blue (S4E05) : William Bouchard 
 2014 - Web of Lies (S1E01) : Wade Ridley

Internet

Webseries 
 2010/... - Out With Dad (Seasons 1 & 2) : Nathan Miller 
 2012 - Clutch (S2E01) : The Double Crosser 
 2013 - Versus Valerie (S1E03) : Randy

Nominations and awards

2011 
2nd annual Indie Soap Awards (1 only winner in a category)
 Nominations: Outstanding Lead Actor for " Out with Dad "

LA Web Series Festival 2011 (multiple prizes in the same category)
 Award : Outstanding Lead Actor in a Drama Series for " Out with Dad "

2012 
3rd annual Indie Soap Awards (1 only winner in a category)
 Nominations:  Best Actor (Drama) for " Out with Dad "

2011 Indie Intertube
 Award : Best Actor in a Drama  for " Out with Dad "

LA Web Series Festival 2012 (multiple prizes in the same category)
 Award : Outstanding Ensemble Cast in a Drama for " Out with Dad "
 Kate Conway, Will Conlon, Lindsey Middleton, Corey Lof, Laura Jabalee, Darryl Dinn, Jacob Ahearn, Wendy Glazier, Robert Nolan.

2013 
4th Indie Soap Awards (2013) (1 only winner in a category)
 Nomination: Best Guest Appearance (Drama)  for " Clutch "

References

External links 

 Official Website, Facebook, Twitter
 IMDb, Will Conlon
 Out with Dad, Cast

Living people
1975 births
Canadian male film actors
Canadian male web series actors
21st-century Canadian male actors